Elections to Redditch Borough Council were held on 10 June 2004. The whole council was up for election with boundary changes since the last election in 2003. The Labour Party gained overall control of the council from no overall control.

Election result

Ward results

References
2004 Redditch election result
Ward results
Election round-up 2004

2004
2004 English local elections
2000s in Worcestershire